The short-tooth moray (Gymnothorax kontodontos) is a moray eel found in coral reefs in the eastern central Pacific Ocean around Fanning Island.

References

kontodontos
Fish described in 2000